Sabi Sabi is a private game reserve in South Africa, situated in the Sabi Sand Game Reserve which flanks the south western section of the Kruger National Park. The Sabi Sand Reserve is one of the parks that make up the Greater Kruger National Park.

It is a conservation area where the big five game (lion, leopard, rhinoceros, buffalo, elephant) occur naturally.

Wildlife

Wildlife present include Southern African wildcat, black-backed jackal, blue wildebeest, Burchell's zebra, Cape buffalo, chacma baboon, civet, common duiker, African bush elephant, South African giraffe, hippopotamus, impala, kudu, large-spotted genet, African leopard, cheetah, lion, reedbuck, scrub hare, side-striped jackal, slender mongoose, spotted hyena, steenbok, tree squirrel, vervet monkey, warthog, waterbuck, southern white rhinoceros, white-tailed mongoose and Cape wild dog. Also seen here are a variety of birds including saddle-billed storks, vultures, cattle egrets and brown-headed parrots, as well as several species of reptile and invertebrates.

See also
 Lower Sabie
 Wildlife of South Africa

References

External links

 Great Hotels of the World
 Sabi Sabi Lodges
 Sabi Sabi on Sabi Sands.com website

Game reserves of South Africa
Protected areas of Mpumalanga